Timegate may refer to:

 TimeGate, an Atlanta-based Doctor Who and Stargate convention
 TimeGate Studios, an American video game developer
 Time-Gate, a 1983 video game
 Time Gate: Knight's Chase, a 1996 video game
 Timegates, a 1997 anthology
  Time Gate  A 1972 children's novel by John Jakes

See also
Time portal